Morton Cecil Cooper (March 2, 1913 – November 17, 1958) was an American baseball pitcher who played eleven seasons in Major League Baseball (MLB). He played from 1938 to 1949 for the St. Louis Cardinals, Boston Braves, New York Giants, and Chicago Cubs. He was the National League Most Valuable Player in 1942. His younger brother, Walker Cooper, also played in the major leagues.

Biography

Born in Atherton, Missouri, Cooper signed for the St. Louis Cardinals as an amateur free agent in 1933 and played for seven of their minor league affiliates until 1938, when the Cardinals promoted him to the major leagues.

Cooper debuted with the Cardinals in 1938 and had a 12–6 record as a 1939 rookie. He was 24–21 over the next two seasons before hitting his stride, helping the team to World Series titles in both 1942 and 1944. 

In 1942, Cooper led the National League with 22 wins, 10 shutouts and a 1.78 ERA, earning NL Most Valuable Player honors.

At the start of the 1945 season, both Mort and his brother Walker staged contract holdouts, demanding that the Cardinals raise their salaries to $15,000 each.  Subsequently, Mort was traded that May to the Boston Braves after only three starts; bothered by longtime elbow problems, he ended the year only 9–4. After a 13–11 season in 1946, he began 1947 at 2–5 and was traded to the New York Giants in June. He was 1–5 for the Giants over the rest of the season, and was released in July 1948 after not pitching all year due to arm trouble.

Cooper ended his career with a single 1949 relief appearance for the Chicago Cubs in which he failed to record an out. He retired with a record of 128–75, a 2.97 ERA, 913 strikeouts, and 33 shutouts in 1840 innings. He was selected to the NL All-Star team four times (1942–43; 1945–46). As a hitter, Cooper recorded a .194 batting average (127-for-654) with 50 runs, six home runs and 68 RBI.

Cooper gained induction into the St Louis Cardinals Hall of Fame and Museum on April 25, 2019.

Personal
Cooper was married to Bernadine, who filed for divorce in 1945.  Together, they had one son, Lonnie.

Cooper lived in Houston for several years in the 1950s. He developed cirrhosis and a staphylococcal infection. He was hospitalized at St. Vincent's Infirmary in Little Rock, Arkansas, for about three weeks before he died.

See also

 List of St. Louis Cardinals team records
 List of Major League Baseball annual ERA leaders
 List of Major League Baseball annual wins leaders

References

External links

Mort Cooper at SABR (Baseball BioProject)

1913 births
1958 deaths
Asheville Tourists players
Baseball players from Missouri
Boston Braves players
Chicago Cubs players
Columbus Red Birds players
Deaths from cirrhosis
Des Moines Demons players
Elmira Red Wings players
Houston Buffaloes players
Major League Baseball pitchers
Muskogee Oilers players
National League All-Stars
National League ERA champions
National League Most Valuable Player Award winners
National League wins champions
New York Giants (NL) players
People from Jackson County, Missouri
Springfield Cardinals players
St. Louis Cardinals players
Wichita Oilers players